San Pablo District is one of four districts of the province Mariscal Ramón Castilla in Peru.

References

Districts of the Mariscal Ramón Castilla Province
Districts of the Loreto Region